Scythropiodes malivora is a moth in the family Lecithoceridae. It was described by Edward Meyrick in 1930. It is found in Korea, Japan (Honshu, Hiroshima), China (Manchuria) and the Russian Far East.

The wingspan is 23–28 mm. The forewings are light ochreous, slightly deeper posteriorly. The discal stigmata are dark fuscous, the plical minute and fuscous, midway between the discal. The hindwings are whitish ochreous.

The larvae have been recorded feeding on Pyrus malus, Malus pumila, Castanea crenata and Lagerstroemia indica.

References

Moths described in 1930
Scythropiodes